Brady Kiernan is a filmmaker. His debut feature was Stuck Between Stations, starring Sam Rosen and Zoe Lister-Jones.

External links
https://web.archive.org/web/20120420024548/http://blogs.citypages.com/gimmenoise/2010/05/director_brady.php
http://movies.nytimes.com/2011/11/04/movies/stuck-between-stations-by-brady-kiernan-review.html

American film directors
Living people
Year of birth missing (living people)
Place of birth missing (living people)